William Reed Mullin (February 12, 1966 – January 27, 2020) was an American musician, best known as the co-founder and drummer of heavy metal band Corrosion of Conformity.

Career 
Mullin was the founding member of Corrosion of Conformity with Mike Dean and Woody Weatherman. Mullin, along with Weatherman, also played in the Raleigh-based hardcore band No Labels. No Labels disbanded in 1984, while Corrosion of Conformity continued to evolve and gain popularity. Mullin left COC on February 1, 2001, due to a back injury.

Following his departure from Corrosion of Conformity, Mullin worked on several other projects, including a hardcore band called Man Will Destroy Himself, and as the frontman for power pop band Brown.

In 2010, he rejoined COC with the Animosity-era lineup.

In 2014, Mullin co-founded the hardcore punk supergroup Teenage Time Killers with COC bandmate Mike Dean and My Ruin guitarist Mick Murphy. Other members include Foo Fighters frontman Dave Grohl, Lamb of God vocalist Randy Blythe, Stone Sour and Slipknot vocalist Corey Taylor, Bad Religion guitarist Brian Baker, former Queens of the Stone Age bassist Nick Oliveri, among others. Teenage Time Killers has signed with Rise Records and has released their debut album Teenage Time Killers: Greatest Hits Vol. 1 on July 28, 2015.

Death 
On January 27, 2020, Mullin died at the age of 53. He had missed a number of shows in the past four years due to a variety of health issues, including an alcohol-related seizure he suffered in June 2016.

Discography

Corrosion of Conformity albums

References 

1959 births
2020 deaths
American heavy metal drummers
Musicians from Raleigh, North Carolina
20th-century American drummers
American male drummers
Corrosion of Conformity members
Teenage Time Killers members
20th-century American male musicians